SDSS J090744.99+024506.8 (SDSS 090745.0+024507) is a short-period variable star in the constellation Hydra. It has a Galactic rest-frame radial velocity of 709 km/s.

Its effective temperature is 10,500 K (corresponding to a spectral type of B9) and its age is estimated to be at most 350 million years. It has a heliocentric distance of 71 kpc. It was ejected from the centre of the galaxy less than 100 million years ago, which implies the existence of a population of young stars at the galactic centre less than 100 million years ago.

Christened by the astronomer Warren Brown as the "outcast star", it is the first discovered member of a class of objects named hypervelocity stars. It was discovered in 2005 at the MMT Observatory of the Center for Astrophysics  Harvard & Smithsonian (CfA), by astronomers Warren Brown, Margaret J. Geller, Scott J. Kenyon and Michael J. Kurtz.

See also
 List of star extremes
 S5-HVS1 – another fast moving star
 US 708 – another fast moving star

References

Further reading

External links
 Press release
 First Stellar Outcast Speeding at Over 1.5 Million Miles Per Hour (PhysOrg.com)

Hydra (constellation)
B-type main-sequence stars
Hypervelocity stars
SDSS objects